Te Hapuku  (died 1878), sometimes known as Te Ika-nui-o-te-moana, was a Māori leader of the Ngāti Te Whatuiāpiti hapū of the Ngāti Kahungunu iwi in Hawke's Bay, New Zealand, and a farmer and assessor. Born in the late 18th century in a small town called Te Hauke, in the first part of his life he was overshadowed in Ngāti Te Whatuiāpiti by his father's cousin Te Pareihe, until the latter's death in 1844. In 1838 Te Hapuku visited the Bay of Islands where he signed the 1835 Declaration of the Independence of New Zealand. In 1840 he initially refused to sign the Treaty of Waitangi when it was brought to Hawke's Bay, but was eventually persuaded to sign. From the 1850s he was a keen seller of land, wishing to attract the economic benefit of European settlers. He now rests in the Urupa in Te Hauke with a cenotaph donated by the New Zealand Government.

References

1878 deaths
Ngāti Te Whatuiāpiti people
Year of birth missing